The Frost Building is a historic building in Nashville, Tennessee, USA. It was built in the 1910s for the Southern Baptist Convention.

Location
The building is located at 161 8th Avenue North in Nashville, the county seat of Davidson County, Tennessee, USA. It stands to the left of the Savage House, another historic building listed on the NRHP.

History
The four-story building was completed in 1913. It was constructed with gray granite. It was designed in the Neoclassical architectural style. It was built as a Sunday school and publishing house for the Southern Baptist Convention. The building was named in honor of Dr James Marion Frost, a Southern Baptist preacher.

In 1979, the building was renovated by the Baptist Sunday School Board, and in 1993, the firm of Hart Freeland Roberts used photographs to restore the office of Dr. Frost.

Architectural significance
It has been listed on the National Register of Historic Places since November 25, 1980.

References

Buildings and structures in Nashville, Tennessee
Churches on the National Register of Historic Places in Tennessee
Neoclassical architecture in Tennessee
Religious buildings and structures completed in 1913
Southern Baptist Convention
School buildings on the National Register of Historic Places in Tennessee
National Register of Historic Places in Nashville, Tennessee